The Ocnele Mari mine is a large salt mine located in southern Romania in Vâlcea County, close to Ocnele Mari. Ocnele Mari represents one of the largest salt reserves in the country, having estimated reserves of 9 billion tonnes of sodium chloride.

References 

Salt mines in Romania